Ṭāriq ibn Ziyād, also known simply as Tarik in English, was a Berber commander who served the Umayyad Caliphate and initiated the Muslim Umayyad conquest of Visigothic Hispania (present-day Spain and Portugal) in 711–718 AD. He led an army and crossed the Strait of Gibraltar from the North African coast, consolidating his troops at what is today known as the Rock of Gibraltar. The name "Gibraltar" is the Spanish derivation of the Arabic name Jabal Ṭāriq (جبل طارق), meaning "mountain of Ṭāriq", which is named after him.

Origins 
Medieval Arabic historians give contradictory data about Ṭāriq's origins and nationality. Some conclusions about his personality and the circumstances of his entry into al-Andalus are surrounded by uncertainty. The vast majority of modern sources state that Ṭāriq was a Berber mawla of Musa ibn Nusayr, the Umayyad governor of Ifriqiya. He is traditionally said to have been born in the Tlemcen region; he had also lived there with his wife prior to his governance of Tangier. Tariq Ibn Ziyad, was a berber from the tribe of the Ulhassa, a tribe native to the Tafna and currently inhabits the Béni Saf region in Algeria.

History 

According to Ibn Abd al-Hakam (803–871), Musa ibn Nusayr appointed Ṭāriq governor of Tangier after its conquest in 710-711 but an unconquered Visigothic outpost remained nearby at Ceuta, a stronghold commanded by a nobleman named Julian, Count of Ceuta.

After Roderic came to power in Spain, Julian had, as was the custom, sent his daughter, Florinda la Cava, to the court of the Visigothic king for education. It is said that Roderic raped her, and that Julian was so incensed he resolved to have the Muslims bring down the Visigothic Kingdom. Accordingly, he entered into a treaty with Ṭāriq (Mūsā having returned to Qayrawan) to secretly convoy the Muslim army across the Straits of Gibraltar, as he owned a number of merchant ships and had his own forts on the Spanish mainland.

On or about April 26, 711, the army of Ṭāriq Bin Ziyad, composed of recent Berber converts to Islam, was landed on the Iberian peninsula (in what is now Spain) by Julian. They debarked at the foothills of a mountain which was henceforth named after him, Gibraltar (Jabal Tariq).

Ṭāriq's army contained about 7,000 soldiers, composed largely of Berber stock but also Arab troops. Roderic, to meet the threat of the Umayyads, assembled an army said to number 100,000, though the real number may well have been much lower. Most of the army was commanded by, and loyal to, the sons of Wittiza, whom Roderic had brutally deposed. Ṭāriq won a decisive victory when Roderic was defeated and killed on July 19 at the Battle of Guadalete.

Ṭāriq Bin Ziyad split his army into four divisions, which went on to capture Córdoba under Mughith al-Rumi, Granada, and other places, while he remained at the head of the division which captured Toledo. Afterwards, he continued advancing towards the north, reaching Guadalajara and Astorga. Ṭāriq was de facto governor of Hispania until the arrival of Mūsā a year later. Ṭāriq's success led Musa to assemble 12,000 (mostly Arab) troops to plan a second invasion, and within a few years Ṭāriq and Musa had captured two-thirds of the Iberian peninsula from the Visigoths.

Both Ṭāriq and Musa were simultaneously ordered back to Damascus by the Umayyad Caliph Al-Walid I in 714, where they spent the rest of their lives. The son of Musa, Abd al-Aziz, who took command of the troops of al-Andalus, was assassinated in 716. In the many Arabic histories written about the conquest of southern Spain, there is a definite division of opinion regarding the relationship between Ṭāriq and Musa bin Nusayr. Some relate episodes of anger and envy on the part of Mūsā that his freedman had conquered an entire country. Others do not mention, or play down, any such bad blood. On the other hand, another early historian, al-Baladhuri, writing in the 9th century, merely states that Mūsā wrote Ṭāriq a "severe letter" and that the two were later reconciled.

Speech 
The 16th-century historian Ahmed Mohammed al-Maqqari, in his The Breath of Perfume, attributes a long speech by Ṭāriq to his troops before the Battle of Guadalete.

Notes

References

Sources

Primary sources 

Pascual de Gayangos y Arce, The History of the Mohammedan Dynasties in Spain. vol. 1. 1840. English translation of al-Maqqari.
al-Baladhuri, Kitab Futuh al-Buldan, English translation by Phillip Hitti in The Origins of, the Islamic State (1916, 1924).
 Anon., Akhbār majmūa fī fath al-andalūs wa dhikr ūmarā'ihā. Arabic text edited with Spanish translation: E. Lafuente y Alcantara, Ajbar Machmua, Coleccion de Obras Arabigas de Historia y Geografia, vol. 1, Madrid, 1867.
 Anon., Mozarab Chronicle.
Ibn Abd al-Hakam, Kitab Futuh Misr wa'l Maghrib wa'l Andalus. Critical Arabic edition of the whole work published by Torrey, Yale University Press, 1932. Spanish translation by Eliseo Vidal Beltran of the North African and Spanish parts of Torrey's Arabic text: "Conquista de Africa del Norte y de Espana", Textos Medievales #17, Valencia, 1966. This is to be preferred to the obsolete 19th-century English translation at: Medieval Sourcebook: The Islamic conquest of Spain
 Enrique Gozalbes Cravioto, "Tarif, el conquistador de Tarifa", Aljaranda, no. 30 (1998) (not paginated).
Muhammad al-Idrisi, Kitab nuzhat al-mushtaq (1154). Critical edition of the Arabic text: Opus geographicum: sive "Liber ad eorum delectationem qui terras peragrare studeant." (ed. Bombaci, A. et al., 9 Fascicles, 1970–1978). Istituto Universitario Orientale, Naples. French translation: .
Ibn Taghribirdi, Nujum al-zahira fi muluk Misr wa'l-Qahira. Partial French translation by E. Fagnan, "En-Nodjoum ez-Zâhîra. Extraits relatifs au Maghreb." Recueil des Notices et Mémoires de la Société Archéologique du Département de Constantine, v. 40, 1907, 269–382.
Ibn Khallikan, Wafayāt al-aʿyān wa-anbāʾ abnāʾ az-zamān. English translation by M. De Slane, Ibn Khallikan's Biographical dictionary, Oriental Translation Fund of Great Britain and Ireland, 1843.
Ibn Idhari, Kitāb al-bayān al-mughrib fī ākhbār mulūk al-andalus wa'l-maghrib. Arabic text ed. G.S. Colin & E. Lévi-Provençal, Histoire de l'Afrique du Nord et de l'Espagne intitulée Kitāb al-Bayān al-Mughrib, 1948.

Secondary sources

External links 

 Pascual de Gayangos y Arce, The History of the Mohammedan Dynasties in Spain. vol. 1. 1840. Authoritative English translation of al-Maqqari available from Google eBooks. This is the translation still cited by modern historians.
 Tarik's Address to His Soldiers, 711 CE, from The Breath of Perfumes. A translation of al-Maqqari's work included in Charles F. Horne, The Sacred Books and Early Literature of the East, (New York: Parke, Austin, & Lipscomb, 1917), Vol. VI: Medieval Arabia, pp. 241–242. Horne was the editor, the translator is not identified. NB: the online extract, often cited, does not include the warning on p. 238 (download the whole book from other sites): "This speech does not, however, preserve the actual words of Tarik; it only presents the tradition of them as preserved by the Moorish historian Al Maggari, who wrote in Africa long after the last of the Moors had been driven out of Spain. In Al Maggari's day the older Arabic traditions of exact service had quite faded. The Moors had become poets and dreamers instead of scientists and critical historians."
 Ibn Abd al-Hakam, rather outdated English translation in Medieval Sourcebook: The Islamic Conquest of Spain

7th-century births
720 deaths
Generals of the Umayyad Caliphate
8th-century people from al-Andalus
Berbers in Gibraltar
7th-century Berber people
8th-century Berber people
Islam in Gibraltar
Military history of Gibraltar
Umayyad governors of Al-Andalus
7th-century Muslims
Umayyad conquest of Hispania
Al-Andalus military personnel